This is a list of members of the Flemish Parliament between 1995 and 1999, following the (first) direct elections of 1995.

Composition

By party

CVP (37)
 Sonja Becq 
 Georges Beerden 
 Jan Béghin (25 September 1997) replaced Brigitte Grouwels (04-07-1995 – 22 September 1997) 
 Leo Cannaerts 
 Georges Cardoen 
 Joachim Coens 
 Carl Decaluwe (04-07-1995 –
 Leo Delcroix 
 Jos De Meyer 
 Paul Deprez  
 Johan De Roo 
 Mia De Schamphelaere 
 Peter Desmet 
 Michel Doomst (04-07-1995 –
 Paul Dumez (04-07-1995 – 
 Veerle Heeren 
 Kathleen Helsen replaced Herman Candries (31 January 1998)
 Hugo Marsoul 
 Erik Matthijs   
 Trees Merckx 
 Marc Olivier 
 Leonard Quintelier  
 Freddy Sarens 
 Eddy Schuermans (04-07-1995 –
 Herman Suykerbuyk 
 John Taylor 
 Maria Tyberghien-Vandenbussche 
 Riet Van Cleuvenbergen 
 Walter Vandenbossche 
 Bart Vandendriessche 
 Mark Van der Poorten 
 Mieke Van Hecke 
 Gilbert Vanleenhove 
 Jef Van Looy 
 Marc Van Peel 
 Hugo Van Rompaey 
 Johan Weyts

VLD (27)

SP (26)

VB (17)

VU (9)

AGALEV (7)

UF (1)

Changes during the legislature

Representatives who resigned

Representatives who changed parties

1995
1990s in Belgium